The fair triumvirate of wit refers to the three 17th and 18th century authors Eliza Haywood, Delarivier Manley, and Aphra Behn.

Term and usage 
The term was coined by poet-critic Rev. James Sterling in a dedicatory verse to Haywood's Secret Histories, Novels, and Poems, and acknowledges the authors' stature as the three most influential women writers of the time. Subsequent feminist literary criticism has helped restore their work–which includes plays, poetry, novels, and essays–to prominence. As the verse appears in the dedication to Haywood's book, it is perhaps unsurprising that Sterling positions her as the most impressive of the three, writing:

Pathetic Behn, or Manley's greater Name;
Forget their Sex, and own when Haywood writ,
She clos'd the Fair triumvirate of Wit.

Notes

References 

+
+
18th-century British women writers
18th-century British writers
Trios